FC Vodnyk Mykolaiv was a Ukrainian football club from Mykolaiv, Mykolaiv Oblast.

League and cup history

{|class="wikitable"
|-bgcolor="#efefef"
! Season
! Div.
! Pos.
! Pl.
! W
! D
! L
! GS
! GA
! P
!Domestic Cup
!colspan=2|Europe
!Notes
|}

References

Defunct football clubs in Ukraine
Football clubs in Mykolaiv
Association football clubs established in 1946
Association football clubs disestablished in 2004
1946 establishments in Ukraine
2004 disestablishments in Ukraine